Adersia is a genus of horseflies of the family Tabanidae. It is the only genus in the tribe Adersiini, and the only member of the subfamily Adersiinae.

Species
Adersia ambigua Oldroyd, 1957
Adersia callani Oldroyd, 1957
Adersia gandarai Dias, 1959
Adersia guichardi Oldroyd, 1957
Adersia maculenta (Dias, 1956)
Adersia oestroides (Karsch, 1888)

References

Tabanidae
Brachycera genera
Taxa named by Ernest Edward Austen
Diptera of Africa